The Gifford Lectures are an annual series of lectures which were established in 1887 by the will of Adam Gifford, Lord Gifford. Their purpose is to "promote and diffuse the study of natural theology in the widest sense of the term – in other words, the knowledge of God." A Gifford lectures appointment is one of the most prestigious honours in Scottish academia. The lectures are given at four Scottish universities: University of St Andrews, University of Glasgow, University of Aberdeen and University of Edinburgh. 

University calendars record that at the four Scottish universities,  the Gifford Lectures are to be  "public and popular, open not only to students of the university, but the whole community (for a tuition fee) without matriculation. Besides a general audience, the Lecturer may form a special class of students for the study of the subject, which will be conducted in the usual way, and tested by examination and thesis, written and oral". In 1889, those attending the Gifford Lectures at the University of St Andrews were described as "mixed" and included women as well as male undergraduates.

The lectures are normally presented as a series over an academic year and given with the intent that the edited content be published in book form. A number of these works have become classics in the fields of theology or philosophy and the relationship between religion and science. 

The first woman appointed was Hannah Arendt who presented in Aberdeen between 1972 and 1974.

A comparable lecture series is the John Locke Lectures, which are delivered annually at the University of Oxford.

List of lectures

Aberdeen
1888-91 E.B. Tylor The Natural History of Religion
1896–98 James Ward Naturalism and Agnosticism
1898–00 Josiah Royce The World and the Individual
1904–06 James Adam The Religious Teachers of Greece
1907–08 Hans Driesch The Science and Philosophy of the Organism
1911–13 Andrew Seth Pringle-Pattison The Idea of God in the light of Recent Philosophy
1914–15 William Ritchie Sorley Moral Values and the Idea of God
1930–32 Etienne Gilson The Spirit of Medieval Philosophy
1936–38 Karl Barth The Knowledge of God and the Service of God according to the Teaching of the Reformation
1939–40 Arthur Darby Nock Hellenistic Religion - The Two Phases
1949–50 Gabriel Marcel The Mystery of Being ,  Faith and Reality 
1951–52 Michael Polanyi Personal Knowledge: Towards a Post-Critical Philosophy, 
1963, 1965 Alister Hardy The Living Stream, The Divine Flame
1965–1967 Raymond Aron La Conscience historique dans la pensée et dans l'action
1973 Hannah Arendt Life of the Mind
1982–84 Richard Swinburne  The Evolution of the Soul, 
1984–85 Freeman Dyson Infinite In All Directions, 
1989–91 Ian Barbour  Religion in an Age of Science, 
1992–93 Jaroslav Pelikan  Christianity and Classical Culture: The Metamorphosis of Natural Theology in the Christian Encounter With Hellenism, 
1994–95 John W. Rogerson  Faith and Criticism in the Work of William Robertson Smith, 1846-1894
1994–95 M. A. Stewart  New Light and Enlightenment
1994–95 Peter Jones  Science and Religion before and after Hume
1994–95 James H. Burns  The Order of Nature
1994–95 Alexander Broadie  The Shadow of Scotus
1997–98 Russell Stannard  The God Experiment
2000–01 John S. Habgood  The Concept of Nature
2003–04 John Haldane  Mind, Soul and Deity
2003 Eleonore Stump  Wandering in the Darkness
2007 Stephen Pattison  Seeing Things: Deepening Relations with Visual Artefacts, 
2009 Alister McGrath  A Fine-Tuned Universe: The Quest for God in Science and Theology, 
2012 Sarah Coakley  Sacrifice Regained: Evolution, Cooperation and God
2014 David N. Livingstone  Dealing with Darwin:  Place, Politics and Rhetoric in Religious Engagements with Evolution, 
2016 Mona Siddiqui  Struggle, Suffering and Hope: Explorations in Islamic and Christian Traditions, 
2017 David Novak  Athens and Jerusalem: God, Humans, and Nature, 
2018 N. T. Wright Discerning the Dawn: History, Eschatology and New Creation, published as History and Eschatology: Jesus and the Promise of Natural Theology, 2019,

Edinburgh
1891 George Gabriel Stokes Natural Theology
1896–98 Cornelis Tiele  On the Elements of the Science of Religion, 
1900–02 William James  The Varieties of Religious Experience,  (several editions in print)
1909–10 William Warde Fowler The Religious Experience of the Roman People, 
1911–12 Bernard Bosanquet The Principle of Individuality and Value, 
1913–14 Henri Bergson The Problem of Personality
1915–16 William Mitchell Ramsay Asianic Elements in Greek Civilization, 
1919–21 George Stout Mind and Matter pub. 1931
1921–23 Andrew Seth Pringle-Pattison Studies in the Philosophy of Religion, 
1923–25 James George Frazer The Worship of Nature 
1926–27 Arthur Eddington The Nature of the Physical World, 
1927–28 Alfred North Whitehead Process and Reality: An Essay in Cosmology, 
1928–29 John Dewey  The Quest for Certainty: A Study of the Relation of Knowledge and Action, 
1934–35 Albert Schweitzer  The Problem of Natural Theology and Natural Ethics (unpublished)
1937–38 Charles Sherrington Man on His Nature, 
1938–40 Reinhold Niebuhr  The Nature and Destiny of Man: A Christian Interpretation , (2 vol set): 
1947–49 Christopher Dawson part 1:Religion and Culture  part 2: Religion and the Rise of Western Culture (1950) 
1949–50 Niels Bohr  Causality and Complementarity: Epistemological Lessons of Studies in Atomic Physics, 
1950–52 Charles Earle Raven Natural Religion and Christian Theology
1952–53 Arnold J. Toynbee  An Historian's Approach to Religion, 
1954–55 Rudolf Bultmann  History and Eschatology: The Presence of Eternity, 
1961–62 John Baillie  The Sense of the Presence of God
1970-71 Eric Lionel Mascall  "The Openness of Being", 
1973–74 Owen Chadwick  The Secularisation of the European Mind in the 19th Century, 
1974–76 Stanley Jaki  The Road of Science and the Ways to God, 
1978–79 Sir John Eccles  The Human Mystery, The Human Psyche, 
1979–80 Ninian Smart  "The Varieties of Religious Identity", published as Beyond Ideology: Religion and the Future of Western Civilisation, 
1980–81 Seyyed Hossein Nasr  Knowledge and the Sacred, 
1981–82 Iris Murdoch  Metaphysics as a Guide to Morals, 
1983–84 David Daiches God and the Poets, 
1984–85 Jurgen Moltmann  God in Creation: A New Theology of Creation and the Spirit of God, 
1985–86 Paul Ricoeur "Oneself as another", 
1986–87 John Hick  An Interpretation of Religion, (2nd ed.): 
1987–88 Alasdair MacIntyre  Three Rival Versions of Moral Enquiry: 
1988–89 Raimon Panikkar Trinity and Theism: 
1989–90 Mary Douglas  Claims on God: published (much revised) as In the Wilderness: 
1991–92 Annemarie Schimmel Deciphering the Signs of God: A Phenomenological Approach to Islam: 
1992-3 Martha C. Nussbaum, "Upheavals of Thought: A Theory of the Emotions," published 2001 Cambridge University Press.
1993–94 John Polkinghorne  Science and Christian Belief: Theological Reflections of a Bottom-up Thinker, 
1995–96 G. A. Cohen If you're an Egalitarian, how come you're so Rich?, published by Harvard University Press under the same title: 
1996–97 Richard Sorabji Emotions and How to Cope with Them, published as Emotion and Peace of Mind: From Stoic Agitation to Christian Temptation, 
1997–98 Holmes Rolston III  Genes, Genesis and God, 
1998–99 Charles Taylor, Living in a Secular Age, published as A Secular Age: 
1999–2000 David Tracy This side of God
2000–01 Onora O'Neill Autonomy and Trust in Bioethics
2001–02 Mohammed Arkoun Inaugurating a Critique of Islamic Reason
2002–03 Michael Ignatieff  The Lesser Evil: Political Ethics in an Age of Terror, 
2003–04 J. Wentzel van Huyssteen  Alone in the World? Human Uniqueness in Science and Theology, 
2004–05 Dame Margaret Anstee, Stephen Toulmin, and Noam Chomsky, delivering a series of lectures dedicated to Edward Said who was scheduled to give the 2004–05 series before his death in 2003.
2005–06 Jean Bethke Elshtain Sovereign God, Sovereign State, Sovereign Self
2006–07 Simon Conway Morris Darwin 's Compass: How Evolution Discovers the Song of Creation and Jonathan Riley-Smith The Crusades and Christianity
2007–08 Alexander Nehamas "Because it was he, because it was I": Friendship and Its Place in Life
2008 Robert M. Veatch, Hipprocratic, Religious and Secular Medical Ethics: The Point of Conflict
2008–09 Diana Eck The Age of Pluralism [April–May 2009]
2009–10 Michael Gazzaniga Mental Life [October 2009]
2009–10 Terry Eagleton The God Debate [March 2010]
2010–11 Professor Peter Harrison Science, Religion and the Modern World, published as The Territories of Science and Religion  
2010–11 Rt Hon Gordon Brown The Future of Jobs and Justice
2011–12 Lord Sutherland of Houndwood David Hume and Civil Society
2011–12 Professor Diarmaid MacCulloch Silence in Christian History: the witness of Holmes' Dog. In 2012 the Gifford Lectures also supported a one-off joint lecture between the Royal Society of Edinburgh and the University of Edinburgh School of Informatics, Jim Al-Khalili Alan Turing: Legacy of a Code Breaker
2012–13 Bruno Latour "Once Out of Nature" - Natural Religion as a Pleonasm
2012–13 Steven Pinker, The Better Angels of Our Nature: A History of Violence and Humanity
2013–14 Baroness Onora O'Neill From Toleration to Freedom of Expression
2013–14 Lord Rowan Williams of Oystermouth Making representations: religious faith and the habits of language
2013–14 Justice Catherine O'Regan "What is Caesar's?" Adjudicating faith in modern constitutional democracies
2014–15 Professor Jeremy Waldron One Another's Equals: The Basis of Human Equality
2014–15 Professor Helga Nowotny Beyond Innovation. Temporalities. Re-use. Emergence.
2015–16 Kathryn Tanner Christianity and the New Spirit of Capitalism
2016–17 Professor Richard English Nationalism, Terrorism and Religion
2016–17 Professor Jeffrey Stout Religion Unbound: Ideals and Powers from Cicero to King
2017–18 Professor Dr Agustín Fuentes Why We Believe: evolution, making meaning, and the development of human natures
2017–18 Professor Elaine Howard Ecklund Science and Religion in Global Public Life
2018–19 Professor Mary Beard The Ancient World and Us: From Fear and Loathing to Enlightenment and Ethics
2019–20 Professor Michael Welker In God's Image: Anthropology

Glasgow
1888–92 Friedrich Max Müller 1888: Natural Religion vol. 1 & 2; 1890: Physical Religion; 1891: Anthropological Religion: 1892: Theosophy or Psychological Religion
1892–96 John Caird  The Fundamental Ideas of Christianity Vol.1&2
1896–98 Alexander Balmain Bruce The Moral Order of the World, The Providential Order of the World
1910-12 John Watson The Interpretation of Religious Experience
1914 Arthur Balfour Theism and Humanism 
1916–18 Samuel Alexander Space, Time, and Deity, volume one: , volume two: 
1922 Arthur Balfour Theism and Thought
1927–28 J. S. Haldane  The Sciences and Philosophy, 
1932–34 William Temple Nature, Man and God
1952–54 John Macmurray The Form of the Personal vol 1: The Self as Agent  vol 2: Persons in Relation 
1959 Carl Friedrich von Weizsäcker The Relevance of Science
1965 Herbert Butterfield Historical Writing and Christian Beliefs and Human Beliefs and the Development of Historical Writing
1970 Richard William Southern The Rise and Fall of the Medieval System of Religious Thought
1974-76 Basil Mitchell Morality, Religious and Secular
1981 Stephen R. L. Clark From Athens to Jerusalem
1985 Carl Sagan The Search for Who We Are, published in 2006 as The Varieties of Scientific Experience: A Personal View of the Search for God, 
1986 Donald M. MacKay Behind the Eye
1988 Don Cupitt Nature and Culture
1988 Richard Dawkins Worlds in Microcosm
1992 Mary Warnock Imagination and Understanding, published as Imagination and Time, 
1993–94 Keith Ward Religion and Revelation 
1995–96 Geoffrey Cantor and John Hedley Brooke  Reconstructing Nature
1997–98 R. J. Berry  Gods, Genes, Greens and Everything
1999–00 Ralph McInerny  Characters in Search of Their Author
2001  Brian Hebblethwaite, George Lakoff, Lynne Baker, Michael Ruse & Philip Johnson-Laird  The Nature and Limits of Human Understanding
2003–04 Simon Blackburn  Reason's Empire
2005 Lenn Goodman, Abdulaziz Sachedina, John E. Hare, Thou Shall Love Thy Neighbor as Thyself
2007–08 David Fergusson Religion and Its Recent Critics published as Faith and Its Critics: A Conversation, 
2008–09 Charles Taylor The Necessity of Secularist Regimes [May 2009]
2009–10 Gianni Vattimo The End of Reality
2012 Vilayanur Ramachandran Body and Mind: Insights from Neuroscience
2014 Jean-Luc Marion Givenness and Revelation
2015 Perry Schmidt-leukel Interreligious Theology: The Future Shape of Theology
2016 Sean M. Carroll The Big Picture: On the Origins of Life, Meaning, and the Universe Itself
2018 Judith Butler My Life, Your Life: Equality and the Philosophy of Non-Violence
2019 Mark Pagel Wired for Culture: The Origins of the Human Social Mind, or Why Humans Occupied the World

St Andrews
1889-90 Andrew Lang The Making of Religion
1894–96 Lewis Campbell Religion in Greek Literature
1902–04 Richard Haldane The Pathway to Reality, 
1917–18 William R. Inge  The Philosophy of Plotinus, 
1919–20 Lewis Richard Farnell Greek Hero Cults and Ideas of Immortality
1921–22 C. Lloyd Morgan Emergent Evolution (1923) , and Life, Mind, and Spirit (1925)
1926-28 Alfred Edward Taylor "The faith of a moralist, The Theological Implications of Morality; Natural Theology and the Positive Religions" (1930)
1929-30 Charles Gore The Philosophy of the Good Life (1930)
1936–37 Werner Jaeger   The Theology of the Early Greek Philosophers (1936)
1953-55 C. A. Campbell On Selfhood and Godhood
1955–56 Werner Heisenberg  Physics and Philosophy: The Revolution in Modern Science, 
1959–60 Georg Henrik von Wright  Norm and Action (1963) and The Varieties of Goodness (1963)
1962–64 Henry Chadwick  Authority in the Early Church
1964–66 John Findlay  The Discipline of the Cave (1966), and The Transcendence of the Cave (1967) 
1967–69 Robert Charles Zaehner  Concordant Discord. The Interdependence of Faiths. Oxford: Clarendon Press 1970.
1972–73 Alfred Ayer  The Central Questions of Philosophy, 
1975–77 Reijer Hooykaas  Fact, Faith and Fiction in the Development of Science
1977–78 David Stafford-Clark  Myth, Magic and Denial
1979-80 Frederick Copleston  ‘Religion and the One: Philosophies East and West’
1980–81 Gregory Vlastos  Socrates: Ironist and Moral Philosopher
1982–83 Donald Geoffrey Charlton  New Images of the Natural, 1750-1800
1983–84 John Macquarrie  In Search of Deity
1984–85 Adolf Grunbaum  Psychoanalytic Theory and Science
1986–87 Antony Flew  The Logic of Mortality
1988–89 Walter Burkert  Tracks of Biology and the Creation of Sense
1990–91 Hilary Putnam  Renewing Philosophy
1992–93 Roger Penrose  The Question of Physical Reality
1992–93 Arthur Peacocke  Nature, God and Humanity
1995 Nicholas Wolterstorff  Thomas Reid and the Story of Epistemology
1996–97 Michael Dummett  Thought and Reality
1999 Robert Merrihew Adams  God and Being
1999 Marilyn McCord Adams  The Coherence of Christology
2001–02 Stanley Hauerwas  With the Grain of the Universe: The Church's Witness and Natural Theology, 
2002–03 Peter van Inwagen  The Problem of Evil, 
2004–05 Alvin Plantinga  Science and Religion: Conflict or Concord
2007 Martin Rees  21st Century Science: Cosmic Perspective and Terrestrial Challenges
2010 Roger Scruton The Face of God
2012 Denis Alexander Genes, Determinism and God
2015 Linda Zagzebski Exemplarist Virtue Theory published as Exemplarist Moral Theory ISBN 978-0-19-065584-6
2017 Michael Rea Though the Darkness Hide Thee: Seeking the Face of the Invisible God
2019 Mark Johnston Ontotheology as Antidote for Idolatry 
2021 Oliver O'Donovan

Support from Templeton Religion Trust

Established at the behest of John Templeton, the Gifford Lectures website was designed to increase the strategic impact of the Gifford program. Developed and managed by Templeton Press through May 2021, the website is now managed through a grant from Templeton Religion Trust.

References

Bibliography
Stanley Jaki, Lord Gifford and His Lectures: A Centenary Retrospect (1987). Scottish Academic Press, .
Larry Witham, The Measure of God: Our Century-Long Struggle to Reconcile Science & Religion (2005), HarperSanFrancisco hardcover: ; reprinted as The Measure of God: History's Greatest Minds Wrestle with Reconciling Science and Religion (2006), paperback: .

External links
Gifford Lectures Online presents full text of many series.

 
1898 in Scotland
Lectures on religion and science
Recurring events established in 1898